Charles Forrest "Spike" Spencer (born December 21, 1968) is an American voice actor and columnist best known for dubbing Japanese anime films. He is known for his roles in ADV Films dubs of Neon Genesis Evangelion as Shinji Ikari, Martian Successor Nadesico as Akito Tenkawa, and Excel Saga as Gojo Shioji. Spencer is well-known for playing the English-version voice of Japanese Anime character Ginta Toramizu (虎水ギンタ Toramizu Ginta) from the MÄR series. He has also performed voice acting for radio, especially commercials. His anime character voices tend to be either for timid, shy, or weak characters, or for eccentric and comical ones.

Career
Spencer attended the University of Houston for four years. After doing a number of independent films, he met Amanda Winn-Lee, who suggested he audition for anime English dubbing at ADV Films. Spencer first landed a supporting role of Prime Minister Mikoshiba in Super Atragon, then a leading role of Takateru in Suikoden Demon Century. In August 1996, Spencer was cast as the lead role of Shinji Ikari in Neon Genesis Evangelion. After ADV Films' collapse, Funimation acquired the rights to the Rebuild of Evangelion movies. As part of Funimation's goal to get the service of the original voice actors from shows and movies they acquired distributing rights for, Spencer reprised Shinji in the movies.

Spencer has done commercials for Houston Cellular, Applebee's, Kroger, Chevrolet, and Subway. Spencer has done additional acting in live-action films and in TV series such as The Big Easy.

Spencer also travels the world with his panel, Don't Kill Your Date (and Other Cooking Tips), which teaches Spencer's trademark "food game," giving dating advice for men, cooking tips, and easy dinner recipes. Spencer's dating tips have been featured in USA Today and Men's Health. He also frequently writes dating tips for Neil Strauss, Carlos Xuma, and Singles Warehouse.

Personal life
Spencer was once married to Kendra Benham, who worked alongside him in Neon Genesis Evangelion as Maya Ibuki. Spencer holds a brown belt in aikido and a 2nd-degree black belt in Tae Kwon Do.  Spencer is married to an entrepreneur, Kim MacKenzie, as of October 4, 2014. He is a foodie and has a website called DontKillYourDate.com.  Spike and Kim have two sons, one named Declan, who was born on July 29, 2017, and another named Colton Christopher, who was born on February 4, 2021, in Australia.

Filmography

Anime dubbing
 Battle Angel – Yugo
 Black Butler – Snake
 BlazBlue Alter Memory – Arakune
 Bleach – Hanataro Yamada, Di Roy Linker, Jinnai Doko
 Boruto: Naruto Next Generations – Inojin Yamanaka
 Bubblegum Crisis: Tokyo 2040 – Mackey Stingray
 Burn Up W – Jackalhead
 Buso Renkin – Koushaku "Papillon" Chouno
 Code Geass: Lelouch of the Rebellion R2 – Rolo Lamperouge
 Colorful – Young T
 Compiler – Toshi Igarashi
 Coppelion – No-sense
 Dirty Pair Flash: Mission Two – Calbee
 Doraemon – Ace Goody (Dekisugi)
 Dragon Ball Super – Majin Buu (Bang Zoom! dub for Toonami Asia)
 Dragon Half – Roshi, Slug
 Durarara!! – Saburo Togusa
 Ellica – Funk
 Excel Saga – Dr. Gojo Shioji
 Fire Emblem – Mars Lowell
 Full Metal Panic! – Shoto Sakimoto, Subordinate A, Takuma
 Gantz – Little Green onion alien
 Golden Boy – Maid
 Kekkaishi – Mamezo
 MÄR: Märchen Awakens Romance – Ginta
 Martian Successor Nadesico – Akito Tenkawa
 Megazone 23 Part 3 – Bud
 Mobile Suit Gundam Unicorn – Dylan McGuinness
 Neon Genesis Evangelion (ADV Films dub)/Rebuild of Evangelion – Shinji Ikari
 Nura: Rise of the Yokai Clan series – Karasu Tengu
 Orphen – Majic Lin
 Panyo Panyo Di Gi Charat – Actor boy
 Plastic Little – Nichol Hawking
 Pretear – Goh
 Puni Puni Poemy – Ball person 3
 Saiyuki – Shien, Demon 6
 Sorcerous Stabber Orphen – Majic
 Spriggan – Little Boy
 Steel Angel Kurumi – Manager, scientist, ticket taker, Tow-Tone
 Suikoden Demon Century – Takatoru Sage
 Super Atragon – Mikoshiba
 Vampire Knight series – Takuma Ichijo
 Zetman – Purse Snatcher (Ep. 3), Kai Isono/Crab EVOL (Ep. 4)

Animation
 Get Blake! – Mitch de la Cuz
 Peter Rabbit – Shrew
 Space Dogs – Venya

Internet Appearances
 Nostalgia Critic – Himself

Film
 NiNoKuni – Toru Shinozaki 
 Stand by Me Doraemon – Hidetoshi Dekisugi
 Stand by Me Doraemon 2 – Hidetoshi Dekisugi

Video games
 Akiba's Trip: Undead & Undressed – Protagonist (Nanashi)
 Ace Combat Infinity – Additional voices
 Armored Core: Verdict Day – Various Pilots, AI
 Ar Tonelico: Melody of Elemia – Jack Hamilton
 Ar Tonelico Qoga: Knell of Ar Ciel – Jack Hamilton
 Atelier Iris 2: The Azoth of Destiny – Felt Blanchimont
 BlazBlue: Calamity Trigger / BlazBlue: Continuum Shift / BlazBlue: Chronophantasma – Arakune
 Bleach: Shattered Blade – Hanataro Yamada
 Bravely Default – Ringabel
 Detective Pikachu – Additional voices
 Dynasty Warriors 7 – Guan Suo
 Dynasty Warriors 8: Xtreme Legends – Guan Suo
 League of Legends – Kled, Wukong
 Lunar: Silver Star Harmony – Nall, Eiphel
 The Bureau: XCOM Declassified – Agent Kinney
 Fire Emblem Awakening – Excellus
 Fist of the North Star: Lost Paradise – Additional voices
 Mana Khemia 2: Fall of Alchemy – Puni Jiro
 Nier Gestalt – Tyrann, Gideon (uncredited)
 Nier Replicant ver.1.22474487139... – Tyrann
 One-Punch Man: A Hero Nobody Knows – Additional voices
 Operation Darkness – Additional voices
 Payday 2 – Taser
 Persona 5 – Psychiatrist
 Puyo Puyo Champions – Maguro Sasaki
 Puyo Puyo Tetris – Maguro Sasaki, Ecolo
 Puyo Puyo Tetris – Maguro Sasaki, Ecolo
 Rune Factory Frontier – Erik, Danny, Kross, Gelwein, Tsubute
 Saints Row: The Third – Mascot, Crazed Fan
 Samurai Warriors 3 – Nagamasa Azai
 Shenmue III – Additional Cast
 Shin Megami Tensei IV: Apocalypse – Hunter
 Shin Megami Tensei: Devil Survivor Overclocked – Atsuro Kihara
 Steambot Chronicles – Vanilla Beans, Basil
 Star Ocean: Second Evolution – Claude C. Kenny
 Sushi Striker: The Way of Sushido – General Ausprey
 World of Warcraft: The Burning Crusade – Attumen the Huntsman, Romulo, Mekgineer Steamrigger, a Blood Elf Male, Essence of Grief
 World of Warcraft: Wrath of the Lich King – Captain Arnath
 Tales of Berseria – Additional voices
 Tales of Vesperia – Yeager
 Tales of Xillia 2 – Additional voices
 The Sky Crawlers: Innocent Aces – Ishitobi, Lautern Unit
 Xenoblade Chronicles X – Additional voices
 Yggdra Union – Milanor 
 Yo-kai Watch 3 – Rongo Swirll
 Lunar: Silver Star Harmony – Nall

References

External links
Official website
Official fansite

Spike Spencer on Facebook
Spike Spencer on Twitter

Don't Kill Your Date (and Other Cooking Tips)
Don't Kill Your Date (and Other Cooking Tips) on Facebook
Don't Kill Your Date (and Other Cooking Tips on Twitter
Spike Spencer on Voice123

Living people
Male actors from Houston
American male film actors
American male voice actors
20th-century American male actors
Place of birth missing (living people)
21st-century American male actors
American male video game actors
People from Los Angeles
Male actors from Los Angeles
University of Houston alumni
American male television actors
1968 births